The Red Apple is a Soviet drama film directed by Tolomush Okeyev. It was entered into the 9th Moscow International Film Festival.

Cast
 Gulsara Adzhibekova
 Suimenkul Chokmorov
 Anara Makhekadirova
 Tattybyubyu Tursunbayeva

References

External links
 

1975 films
1975 drama films
Soviet drama films
Russian drama films
1970s Russian-language films
Films directed by Tolomush Okeyev